Artur Mkrtchyan is an Armenian Greco-Roman wrestler.

Mkrtchyan was a member of the Armenian Greco-Roman wrestling team at the 2012 Wrestling World Cup. The Armenian team came in tenth place. Mkrtchyan personally won a silver medal.

References

Living people
Armenian male sport wrestlers
Year of birth missing (living people)
21st-century Armenian people